Wincham is a civil parish and village in the unitary authority of Cheshire West and Chester and the ceremonial county of Cheshire, England. It is about three miles north of Northwich in the Cheshire Plain.  The Trent and Mersey Canal runs through the parish.

The whole area around Wincham was the site of salt mining for many years, with the Lion Salt Works at nearby Marston.  This industry finally ceased in the village in 2005 when New Cheshire Salt Works was bought by British Salt and closed down the following year. In 2015 the Lion Salt Works re-opened to provide a museum on the history of salt production in Cheshire. A butterfly garden in the grounds is managed by Butterfly Conservation.

The population of the parish was:

 1801:  367
 1851:  684
 1901: 1054
 1951:  890
 2001: 2289
 2015: 3045

The village is home to Wincham Community Primary School.

It is home to Witton Albion Football Club who moved to Wincham Park in 1989.

See also

Listed buildings in Wincham

References

External links

 Wincham Parish Plan

Villages in Cheshire
Civil parishes in Cheshire